The Gabon national under-16 basketball team is a national basketball team of Gabon, administered by the Fédération Gabonaise de Basket-Ball.
This team represents the country in international under-16 (under age 16) basketball competitions.

See also
Gabon men's national basketball team
Gabon men's national under-18 basketball team
Gabon women's national under-16 basketball team

References

External links
Archived records of Gabon team participations

Basketball teams in Gabon
Men's national under-16 basketball teams
Basketball